John Grahl (died 2009), also known as Waterproof, was a Ghanaian comedian and actor. He featured on numerous shows and was Ghana's first stand-up comedian.

References

Ghanaian comedians
2009 deaths
Year of birth missing